, also known under his pen name , was a leading Japanese intellectual and scholar of the Meiji period.  Anesaki is credited as being the father of religious studies in Japan, but also wrote on a variety of subjects including culture, literature, and politics. He was also a member of the International Committee on Intellectual Cooperation of the League of Nations.

After studies in Philosophy at the Tokyo Imperial University, he spent three years in Europe (1900–1903).  During this time he studied under Deussen, Hermann Oldenberg, Gerbe, and Albrecht Weber in Germany, as well as Thomas William Rhys Davids in England.

He spent more than another year abroad in 1908–09 with partial support from Albert Kahn, the French Philanthropist. During that time he traveled extensively through Italy, tracing the steps of Saint Francis of Assisi. His travelogue Hanatsumi Nikki (Flowers of Italy) recounts that journey.

He spent 1913 to 1915 as a visiting scholar at Harvard University lecturing on Japanese literature and life.  The lecture notes from this period were revised and were later the base for the book History of Japanese Religion.  He was also instrumental in founding the scholarly collection that became the library of the University of Tokyo.

A devout Nichiren Buddhist, he also published such titles as "How Christianity appeals to a Japanese Buddhist" (Hibbert Journal, 1905).  He translated Schopenhauer's Die Welt als Wille und Vorstellung into Japanese and explored terms of understanding between Buddhism and Western Philosophy.

Selected works
 Nichiren: The Buddhist Prophet, 1916.
 Hanatsumi Nikki, 1909 (recently translated as Flowers of Italy, 2009)
 Quelques pages d'histoire religieuse du Japon, 1921
 A Concordance to the History of Kirishitan Missions, 1930
 History of Japanese Religion. With special Reference to the social and moral Life of the Nation, 1930
 Art, Life and Nature in Japan, 1933
 Religious Life of the Japanese People. Its present Status and historical Background, 1938
 Waga Shogai (My Life), 1951

References

Sources
 
 Ishibashi, Tomonobu (1943), Masaharu Anesaki. Ein kurzes Lebensbild, Monumenta Nipponica 6 (1/2), i-x 
 Isomae, Jun'ichi; Jacobowitz, Seth (2002), The Discursive Position of Religious Studies in Japan: Masaharu Anesaki and the Origins of Religious Studies. Method and Theory in the Study of Religion 14 (1), 21-46

External links
International Dictionary of Intellectual Historians
Masaharu Anesaki: A Life Chronology

Japanese academics
Japanese writers
Japanese non-fiction writers
English-language writers from Japan
1873 births
1949 deaths
Officiers of the Légion d'honneur
University of Tokyo alumni
Nichiren Buddhists
Japanese Buddhists
Japanese scholars of Buddhism
League of Nations people